James Patrick Donleavy (23 April 1926 – 11 September 2017) was an American-Irish novelist, short story writer and playwright. His best-known work is the novel The Ginger Man, which was initially banned for obscenity.

Early life
Donleavy was born in Brooklyn, to Irish immigrants Margaret and Patrick Donleavy, and grew up in the Bronx. His father was a firefighter, and his mother came from a wealthy background. He had a sister, Mary Rita, and a younger brother. He received his education at various schools in the United States, then served in the US Navy during World War II. After the war ended, he moved to Ireland. In 1946 he began studying bacteriology at Trinity College Dublin, but left in 1949 before taking a degree.

Career
Donleavy's first published work was a short story entitled A Party on Saturday Afternoon, which appeared in the Dublin literary periodical Envoy in 1950. He gained critical acclaim with his first novel, The Ginger Man (1955), which is one of the Modern Library 100 best novels. The novel, of which Donleavy's friend and fellow writer Brendan Behan was the first person to read the completed manuscript, was banned in Ireland and the United States by reason of obscenity. Lead character Sebastian Dangerfield was in part based on Trinity College companion Gainor Crist, an American Navy veteran also studying at Trinity College on the G.I. Bill, whom Donleavy once described in an interview as a "saint", though of a Rabelaisian kind.

Correctly or incorrectly, his initial works are sometimes grouped with the kitchen sink artists as well as the "Angry Young Men". Another novel, A Fairy Tale of New York, provided the title of the song "Fairytale of New York".

In March 2007, Donleavy was the castaway on BBC Radio 4's Desert Island Discs.

In 2015, Donleavy was the recipient of the Bob Hughes Lifetime Achievement Award at the Bord Gáis Energy Irish Book Awards.

In 2016, Trinity College Dublin awarded him with an honorary doctorate.

Personal life
Donleavy declared himself to be an atheist at the age of 14. In 1946, he married Valerie Heron; the couple had two children: Philip (born 1951) and Karen (born 1955). They divorced in 1969 and he remarried in 1970 to Mary Wilson Price; that union ended in divorce in 1989. In 2011, it was reported that Donleavy had not fathered his two children with Price. A DNA test in the early 1990s had confirmed that Rebecca was the daughter of brewing scion Kieran Guinness, and Rory was the son of Kieran's older brother Finn, whom Price married after her divorce from Donleavy. "My interest is only to look after the welfare of the child," Donleavy told The Times, "and after a certain stage, you can't worry about their parentage".

He lived at Levington Park, a country house on  directly on Lough Owel, near Mullingar, County Westmeath, from 1972. Throughout much of his life, he was known as Mike by close friends, though the origins of this nickname are unclear.

Donleavy died on 11 September 2017, aged 91.

List of works

 The Ginger Man (novel) Olympia Press, Paris 1955
 What They Did in Dublin, with The Ginger Man (a play) MacGibbon & Kee, London 1961
 The Ginger Man (play) Random House, New York 1961
 Fairy Tales of New York (play), Penguin, UK 1961 Random House, New York 1961
 A Singular Man Atlantic-Little, Brown, Boston 1963
 Meet My Maker the Mad Molecule (stories/sketches) Atlantic-Little, Brown, Boston 1964
 A Singular Man (play) The Bodley Head, UK 1965
 The Saddest Summer of Samuel S (novella) Delacorte Press, New York 1966
 The Beastly Beatitudes of Balthazar B (novel) Delacorte Press, New York 1968
 The Onion Eaters (novel) Delacorte Press, New York 1971
 The Plays of JP Donleavy Delacorte Press, New York 1972
 A Fairy Tale of New York (novel) Delacorte Press, New York 1973
 J.P. Donleavy: The Plays Penguin, UK 1974
 The Unexpurgated Code: A Complete Manual of Survival & Manners (non-fiction) Delacorte Press, New York 1975
  (novel) Franklin Library, Franklin Center, Pennsylvania 1977
 Schultz (novel) Delacorte Press, New York 1979
  (novel) Franklin Library, Franklin Center, Pennsylvania 1983
 De Alfonce Tennis... (novel) Weidenfeld & Nicolson, London 1984
 J. P. Donleavy's Ireland... (non-fiction) Viking, New York, 1986 (Michael Joseph, London 1986)
 Are You Listening Rabbi Löw (novel), Viking, London 1987
 A Singular Country (nonfiction) Ryan, Peterborough, UK 1989
 That Darcy, That Dancer, That Gentleman (novel) Viking, London 1990
 The History of the Ginger Man (nonfiction) Houghton Mifflin, New York, 1994|Viking, London 1994
 (novella) Thornwillow Press, US 1995
 An Author and His Image (collected short pieces – nonfiction) Viking, London 1997
 Wrong Information is Being Given Out at Princeton (novel) Thomas Dunn-St. Martins Press, New York (Viking, London) 1998
 A Letter Marked Personal (novel) The Lilliput Press, Arbour Hill, Dublin 2019

References

External links

J. P. Donleavy, I Write About People I Like / Rina Sherman, Cineportrait, HDV, 78 min, k éditeur, Paris, 2012
JPDonleavy-Compendium.org

 

"The Ginger Man in Dublin", Totally Gonzo, 17 June 2008
"Tea & Scones & Darcy Dancer: The Making of An Irish Gentleman – An Interview with J.P. Donleavy", Bloomsbury Review, E. Thomas Wood, January/February 1992
"J.P. Donleavy", Contemporary Authors Online, Gale, 2010.
"A singular man: J P Donleavy on his fascinating life since The Ginger Man" John McEntee, The Independent, 5 August 2010
J.P. Donleavy interviewed by Stephen Banker, circa 1978
 

1926 births
2017 deaths
Alumni of Trinity College Dublin
20th-century American novelists
American atheists
American people of Irish descent
American emigrants to Ireland
Irish atheists
Irish dramatists and playwrights
Irish novelists
Irish male writers
People from County Westmeath
Writers from New York City
Postmodern writers
20th-century American dramatists and playwrights
American male novelists
American male dramatists and playwrights
United States Navy personnel of World War II
20th-century American male writers
Novelists from New York (state)